The Carthage Street Circuit was a street circuit in Tunis used in the Tunis Grand Prix between 1931 and 1937.

History
The Tunis Grand Prix was originally held on a street circuit at Le Bardo, west of Tunis. After two Grands Prix, a much larger triangular highway circuit was used. It was laid out between the then separate cities of Tunis and Carthage.
After 1937, the Tunis Grand Prix was not held until 1955, in Parc du Belvedere as Circuito du Belvedere, which was also used during historic revival events between 2000 and 2008.

Course layout
The main straight (2,25 km) is now located on the N9 from the populated area Ain Zaghouan to the border with the populated place Les Berges du Lac. From there the course follows a second straight (2,32 km) through El Aouina, just east of La Charguia airport. The most northern point of the course is located in La Soukra, from where it follows the N10 south down to Sidi Daoud, where a hairpin and a slow chicane leads back to the main straight. The total length of the circuit is 12,9 km.

Carthage
Defunct motorsport venues in France
Motorsport in Tunisia
Sports venues in Tunisia